The Senate of Zimbabwe is the upper of the two chambers in Zimbabwe's Parliament. It existed from independence in 1980 until 1989, and was re-introduced in November 2005. The other chamber of Parliament is the National Assembly.

In its current form, the Senate has 80 members. Of these, 60 members are elected from 10 six-member constituencies (based on the provinces) by proportional representation using party lists; the lists must have a woman at the top and alternate between men and women. The other 20 seats include two reserved for people with disabilities and 18 for traditional chiefs.

History before abolition

The original Senate consisted of 40 members, the majority of whom were elected by the House of Assembly (the directly elected lower chamber), with the remainder being chosen by the Council of Chiefs and appointed by the President. Under the Lancaster House Agreement, 20% of seats in both chambers were reserved for whites, until 1987. It was abolished in 1989 with Constitution of Zimbabwe Amendment No. 31, with membership of the House of Assembly being expanded to include those nominated by the President.

History after reestablishment

The re-established Senate, formed following the elections held on 26 November 2005, had a total of 66 members. 50 members (5 from each province) were directly elected in single-member constituencies using the First-past-the-post system. The President appointed 6 additional members and the remaining 10 seats were held by traditional chiefs who were chosen in separate elections. Twenty-one women (20 elected and 1 appointed) occupy seats in the Senate.

The Constitution of Zimbabwe Amendment No 18 of 2007 provided for the expansion of the Senate to 93 seats: six Senators from each province directly elected by voters registered in the 60 Senate constituencies; the 10 Provincial Governors appointed by the President; the president and deputy president of Council of Chiefs; 16 chiefs, being two chiefs from each province other than metropolitan provinces, and five Senators appointed by the President.

The current Senate resulted from the 2013 constitution. The current Senate consists of 80 members, of whom 60 are elected for five-year terms in 6-member constituencies representing one of the 10 provinces, elected based on the votes in the lower house election, using party-list proportional representation, distributed using the hare quota. Additionally the Senate consists of 2 seats for each non-metropolitan district of Zimbabwe elected by each provincial assembly of chiefs using SNTV, 1 seat each for the president and deputy president of the National Council of Chiefs and 1 male and 1 female seat for people with disabilities elected on separate ballots using FPTP by an electoral college designated by the National Disability Board.

See also
History of Zimbabwe
House of Assembly of Zimbabwe
Legislative branch
List of national legislatures
List of presidents of the Senate of Zimbabwe
List of Zimbabwean parliamentary constituencies

References

 
Government of Zimbabwe
Zimbabwe